Conyngham may refer to:

People
 Barry Conyngham (born 1944), Australian composer and academic
 Dalton Conyngham (1897-1979), South African cricketer
 Elizabeth Conyngham, Marchioness Conyngham (1769-1861), last mistress of King George IV of the United Kingdom
 Francis Conyngham, 2nd Marquess Conyngham (1797-1876), Irish soldier and politician
 Francis Conyngham, 2nd Baron Conyngham (c. 1725-1787), Irish politician
 George Conyngham, 3rd Marquess Conyngham (1825-1882), British peer and soldier
 Gustavus Conyngham (c. 1744-1819), Irish merchant sea captain, officer in the Continental Navy and privateer
 Henry Conyngham, 1st Marquess Conyngham (1766-1832), Irish politician, husband of Elizabeth Conyngham
 Henry Conyngham, 8th Marquess Conyngham (born 1951), Irish politician
 Henry Conyngham, 1st Earl Conyngham 1705-1781), British Member of Parliament 
 Henry Francis Conyngham, Earl of Mount Charles (1795-1824), Irish politician
 Henry Conyngham (soldier) (pre 1681-c. 1705), Irish soldier and Member of Parliament
 William Burton Conyngham (1733-1796), British Member of Parliament
 Conyngham Greene (1854–1934), British diplomat

Places
 Conyngham, Pennsylvania
 Conyngham Township, Columbia County, Pennsylvania
 Conyngham Township, Luzerne County, Pennsylvania

Other uses
 Marquess Conyngham, a title in the Peerage of Ireland
 SS Empire Conyngham (1899–1949)
 USS Conyngham, three U.S. Navy destroyers named after Gustavus Conyngham

See also
 
 Coningham (disambiguation)